Warren County Public Schools (WCPS) may refer to:
 Warren County Public Schools (Kentucky)
 Warren County Public Schools (Virginia)
 Warren County Schools (North Carolina)

See also
 Warren County School District (Pennsylvania)